Minuscule 366 (in the Gregory-Aland numbering), Cμ24 (Soden), is a Greek minuscule manuscript of the New Testament, on parchment. Paleographically it has been assigned to the 14th century. 
It has marginalia.

Description 

The codex contains the text of the Gospel of Matthew on 323 parchment leaves with lacunae (Matthew 1:1-2:16). It is written in one column per page, in 31 lines per page. The biblical text is written in red. It is surrounded by a catena.

It contains  (lessons) and many marginal notes added by a later hands.

Text 

The Greek text of the codex is a representative of the Byzantine text-type. Aland placed it in Category V.

History 

The manuscript was added to the list of New Testament manuscripts by Scholz (1794–1852). 
It was examined by Burgon and C. R. Gregory (1886).

The manuscript is currently housed at the Biblioteca Laurentiana (Conv. Soppr. 171) in Florence.

See also 

 List of New Testament minuscules
 Biblical manuscript
 Textual criticism

References

Further reading 

 

Greek New Testament minuscules
14th-century biblical manuscripts